Richard Harrison was an English cricketer.  Harrison was a left-handed batsman who bowled right-arm fast-medium.  He was born in Clitheroe, Lancashire.

Harrison played for Lancashire Second XI from 1906 to 1908.  He joined Durham in 1910, making his debut for the county in the 1910 Minor Counties Championship against Northumberland.  He played Minor counties cricket for Durham from 1910 to 1913, making 23 appearances.  During this period he made a single first-class appearance for the Minor Counties against the touring South Africans in 1912.  He batted once in this match, scoring 8 unbeaten runs in the Minor Counties first-innings, before retiring hurt.

References

External links
Dick Harrison at ESPNcricinfo
Dick Harrison at CricketArchive

1881 births
People from Clitheroe
English cricketers
Durham cricketers
Minor Counties cricketers
Year of death missing